Jean-François Kornetzky (born 27 July 1982) is a French former professional footballer who played as a goalkeeper.

References

External links
 
 

1982 births
Living people
People from Wissembourg
French footballers
Footballers from Alsace
Association football goalkeepers
Karlsruher SC II players
Karlsruher SC players
RC Strasbourg Alsace players
SR Colmar players
SV Sandhausen players
SC Schiltigheim players
FC Rot-Weiß Erfurt players
Dynamo Dresden players
SV Röchling Völklingen players
US Hostert players
Bundesliga players
2. Bundesliga players
3. Liga players
Regionalliga players
French expatriate footballers
French expatriate sportspeople in Germany
Expatriate footballers in Germany
Sportspeople from Bas-Rhin